is a former Japanese lawmaker from the  Liberal Democratic Party who lost his single member district seat in the House of Representatives to Constitutional Democratic Party of Japan member Kan Naoto in the October 2017 general election by 1,046 votes.

Tsuchiya entered national politics after resigning from his position as mayor of Musashino, Tokyo in 2005 to run against the then Deputy President of the Democratic Party of Japan, Kan, for the House of Representatives seat in the Tokyo 18th district. Although Tsuchiya lost in the run-off, he was still elected under the party-list proportional representation system. Kan and Tsuchiya have since continued to face off in House of Representatives elections, with Kan holding on to the single member district seat through the 2009 general election, and Tsuchiya capturing the single member district seat in the 2012 general election and the 2014 general election.

In the October 2017 general election, Tsuchiya was unable to secure a seat in the House of Representatives under the party-list proportional representation system due to a rule within the Liberal Democratic Party limiting party-list proportional representation candidates to those aged 73 or under. Tsuchiya was 75 at the time he ran in the October 2017 general election.

External links 
 The website of Masatada Tsuichiya
 "Cable TV accused of bias / Tokyo broadcaster criticized for coverage of political figure". The Daily Yomiuri. May 14, 2006.
 "Koizumi launches campaign before Sept 11 elections". AFP, Tokyo. August 30, 2005.
 "Koizumi tells new LDP elects not to represent specific interests." Kyodo News International, Inc. September 26, 2005.

1942 births
Living people
People from Western Tokyo
Waseda University alumni
Mayors of places in Tokyo
Koizumi Children
Members of the House of Representatives (Japan)
Liberal Democratic Party (Japan) politicians